Mukim Amo is a mukim in Temburong District, Brunei.

Name 
The mukim is named after Kampong Amo, one of the villages it encompasses.

Geography 
The mukim is located in the eastern part of the district, bordering Mukim Batu Apoi to the north-east, Mukim Bokok to the west and Mukim Bangar to north-west, as well as the Malaysian state of Sarawak to the east and south.

Hills 

Demographics 
As of 2016 census, the population was 2,144 with  males and  females. The mukim had 421 households occupying 377 dwellings. The entire population lived in rural areas.

Villages 
As of 2016, the mukim comprised the following census villages:

Facilities

Schools 
The government primary schools in the mukim include:
 Amo Primary School
 Selangan Primary School

Meanwhile, the government schools for the country's Islamic religious primary education include:
 Amo Religious School
 Selangan Religious School

Mosques 
 Kampong Selangan Mosque — inaugurated on 14 December 1979; it can accommodate 200 worshippers.
  — constructed in 1993 and completed in the following year; it can accommodate 160 worshippers.

Notes

References

External links 
 Profile of Amo in the Temburong District Office website 

Amo
Temburong District